The Japanese raid on Darwin of 2 May 1943 was a significant battle in the North Western Area Campaign of World War II. During the raid a force of over 20 Japanese bombers and Zero fighters attacked the Australian town of Darwin, Northern Territory, inflicting little damage on the ground. This attack was the 54th Japanese airstrike over Australia. 

The Royal Australian Air Force (RAAF) unit responsible for protecting the town, No. 1 Wing RAAF, intercepted the Japanese force after it had completed its attack, and suffered heavy losses from the Japanese fighters, aggravated by fuel shortages. The results of the battle led to public concern, and No. 1 Wing adopted new fighting tactics which proved successful in countering later raids.

References
 
 
 
 
 
 
 

Military attacks against Australia
History of Darwin, Northern Territory
Battles of World War II involving Australia
1943 in Australia
World War II aerial operations and battles of the Pacific theatre
Aerial operations and battles of World War II involving the United Kingdom
Aerial operations and battles of World War II involving Australia
Aerial operations and battles of World War II involving Japan
Conflicts in 1943
Air-to-air combat operations and battles
Airstrikes conducted by Japan
1940s in the Northern Territory
May 1943 events
20th century in Darwin, Northern Territory